Blažo Pešikan (Cyrillic: Блажо Пешикан; born 15 February 1971) is a Montenegrin former footballer who played mostly as a midfielder.

Club career
Pešikan played with FK Sutjeska Nikšić before becoming part of the famous Partizan Belgrade squads of the early 1990s, most notably winning the double in 1993–94. This was the second double in Partizan's (football) history. Though a talented defensive-style player, injuries prevented him from achieving his full potential thus Zoran Mirković was signed as a replacement. In total, he logged 47 appearances for Partizan, scoring two goals. One was a domestic league match while the rest a collection of friendlies.  He played with FK Vrbas in the seasons 1998–99 and 1999–00.

Personal life
At the junior level, he was a national long jump champion in SR Montenegro. After his playing career, he emigrated to Toronto.

Honours
Partizan
 First League of FR Yugoslavia: 1993–94
 FR Yugoslavia Cup: 1993–94

References

1971 births
Living people
Footballers from Nikšić
Canadian people of Montenegrin descent
Canadian people of Serbian descent
Association football midfielders
Yugoslav footballers
Montenegrin footballers
Serbia and Montenegro footballers
FK Sutjeska Nikšić players
FK Partizan players
FK Mladost Lučani players
FK Hajduk Kula players
OFK Beograd players
FK Borac Čačak players
Yugoslav Second League players
First League of Serbia and Montenegro players